Villars-les-Dombes (literally Villars near Dombes) is a commune in the Ain department in eastern France.
Its people are known as Villardois.

Geography
The town is located within Ain, half-way between Lyon (33 km) and Bourg-en-Bresse (29 km), in the heart of the area known as the Dombes, notable for its hundreds of lakes which are waterfowl habitats and are suitable for breeding fish. Its ornithological park, Parc des Oiseaux, is the largest in France.

The Chalaronne river forms part of the commune's south-western border, flows northward through the western part of the commune, crosses the town, then forms part of its northern border.

History
The lordship of Villars (of which archival evidence dates from 940) became, by marriage, the lordship of Thoire-et-Vilars in 1188, and in about 1400 its caput was Trévoux (the estate was managed from there). In 1565, Villars was promoted to a marquisate dependent on the house of Savoie (Savoy), a benefice of the Honour of Savoy.

Population

See also
 Dombes
Communes of the Ain department

References

External links

 
 Dombes and Villars-les-Dombes
 Photos of Villars-les-Dombes

Communes of Ain
Dombes
Ain communes articles needing translation from French Wikipedia